Anthony Beltoise (born 21 July 1971, in Neuilly-sur-Seine) is a French auto racing driver. He is the son of former Grand Prix motorcycle racer and Formula One driver Jean-Pierre Beltoise and nephew of fellow Formula One driver François Cevert, as his mother is Cevert's sister.

Career

Single-seaters
Beltoise began his career in the Championnat de France Formula Renault 2.0 in 1993, finishing tenth, and improving to seventh in 1994. He competed in the French Formula Three Championship in 1995 and 1996, finishing eleventh in 1995 and runner-up to Soheil Ayari in 1996. Beltoise competed in the 1997 International Formula 3000 season, although failed to score any points in seven races.

After single-seaters
Beltoise competed in the 1998 International Sports Racing Series season, finishing the season tenth. He then competed in the Renault Sport Clio Trophy between 1999 and 2002, finishing 4th, 11th, 3rd and 6th over the four years. Since 2004 he has competed in the Porsche Carrera Cup France, winning it in 2005, 2006 and 2008. He has also regularly competed in the FFSA GT Championship. In 2007 he made a one-off appearance for Exagon Engineering in the World Touring Car Championship at Pau. Since 2007 he has often raced in the Le Mans Series.

24 Hours of Le Mans results

References

External links
 

1971 births
Living people
French racing drivers
French Formula Renault 2.0 drivers
French Formula Three Championship drivers
International Formula 3000 drivers
24 Hours of Le Mans drivers
World Touring Car Championship drivers
European Le Mans Series drivers
Porsche Supercup drivers
Blancpain Endurance Series drivers
ADAC GT Masters drivers
24 Hours of Spa drivers
Sportspeople from Neuilly-sur-Seine
24H Series drivers
Oreca drivers
Saintéloc Racing drivers
Boutsen Ginion Racing drivers
GT4 European Series drivers
Porsche Carrera Cup Germany drivers